Łukasz Kubot and Oliver Marach, who were the defending champions, decided to not compete this year.
Rohan Bopanna and Aisam-ul-Haq Qureshi defeated Henri Kontinen and Jarkko Nieminen 6–2, 7–6(7) in the final.

Seeds

Draw

Draw

References
 Doubles Draw

IPP Open - Doubles
IPP Open